Microscaphidiidae is a family of flatworms belonging to the order Plagiorchiida.

Genera

Genera:
 Angiodictyum Looss, 1902
 Curumai Travassos, 1961
 Denticauda Fukui, 1929

References

Platyhelminthes